José Manuel Otero Novas (born 20 March 1940) is a Spanish politician from the Union of the Democratic Centre (UCD) who served as Minister of Education from April 1979 to September 1980 and previously as Minister of the Presidency from July 1977 to April 1979.

References

1940 births
Living people
University of Oviedo alumni
Government ministers of Spain
20th-century Spanish politicians
Education ministers of Spain